The 1998 United States Senate election in Arizona was held November 3. Incumbent Republican U.S. Senator John McCain won re-election to a third term.

General election

Candidates
 John McCain, incumbent U.S. Senator (Republican)
 Bob Park (Reform)
 Ed Ranger, attorney (Democratic)
 John C. Zajac (Libertarian)

Results

See also 
 1998 United States Senate elections

References 

United States Senate
Arizona
1998
John McCain